Talinga or Bwisi is a language spoken in the Uganda–Congo border region. It is called Talinga (Kitalinga) in DRC and Bwisi (Lubwisi, Olubwisi) in Uganda.

Writing system

References

Languages of the Democratic Republic of the Congo
Languages of Uganda
Great Lakes Bantu languages